Three Rivers is a local government district in southwest Hertfordshire, England. Its council is based in Rickmansworth.

The district was formed on 1 April 1974, under the Local Government Act 1972, by the merger of Rickmansworth Urban District, Chorleywood Urban District and part of Watford Rural District. The confluence of the Chess and the Gade with the Colne in Rickmansworth inspired the district's name. The main offices are located in Rickmansworth in Three Rivers House, opened in 1991.

District council

Three Rivers is a non-metropolitan district that elects one-third of its councillors every four years and with the fourth year for elections to Hertfordshire County Council. In the 2014 elections new ward boundaries came into effect and the council was reduced from 48 to 39 seats. All seats were contested at that election although future elections will continue to be conducted in thirds.

The Liberal Democrat administration fell to minority status with the resignation of two councillors from the party, in March and April 2018.

Following the 2 May 2019 elections, the composition of the council is:

Wards
Three Rivers is composed of thirteen wards, each electing three councillors:

 Abbots Langley and Bedmond
 Carpenders Park
 Chorleywood North and Sarratt
 Chorleywood South and Maple Cross
 Dickinsons
 Durrants
 Gade Valley
 Leavesden
 Moor Park and Eastbury
 Oxhey Hall and Hayling
 Penn and Mill End
 Rickmansworth Town
 South Oxhey

Responsibilities

Three Rivers District Council carries out a variety of district council functions including:
Benefits - Housing and Council Tax
Car Parking
Concessionary Travel
Council Tax - Administration and Collection
Elections and Electoral Registration
Environmental Health (includes Domestic and Commercial Premises)
Food Safety and Hygiene Complaints
Noise Pollution and Pest Control
Housing Administration
Licensing
Caravan Sites
Planning, including Planning Applications, Advice and Appeals
Public Conveniences
Health and Leisure Centres
Refuse Collection
Recycling
Tourism and Visitor Information

Composition

The Council is controlled by the Liberal Democrats, who hold 23 of the 39 seats. The Conservatives form the second-largest faction, with 12, of the seats followed by Labour with 3 seats and Greens with 1 seat.

Three Rivers is a non-metropolitan district that elects one-third of its councillors at any one time with councillor elected three times every four years, with the fourth for elections to Hertfordshire County Council). In the 2016 elections, the council remained under a minority Liberal Democrat administration. The Liberal Democrats regained their majority following a by-election in January 2017. Previously, there were 48 seats: half of the wards elected two councillors each. Nine elected three councillors each. Sarratt ward elected one.

Councillors are divided into classes depending on the year of their retirement. Usually, this will be four years after their election. However, if a ward elects two members at a given election (because of a by-election being held at the same time as a normal election), the councillor with the most votes receives the later of the two available retirement dates.

Political Control

County council
For elections to Hertfordshire County Council, the district is divided into six divisions, three of which are held by the Conservatives, and three by the Liberal Democrats:

Parliament
For parliamentary elections, the district is divided across three constituencies. Most of the district is within the South West Hertfordshire constituency, which is considered a safe Conservative seat and held by a Conservative MP (currently Gagan Mohindra) since its creation in 1950. The eastern parts of the constituency, to the north and south of Watford, are part of that borough's constituency, which is a three-way marginal currently held by Conservative Dean Russell, having fluctuated between Labour and the Conservatives. Parts of two wards, north of the M25, are in the St Albans constituency, which is currently held by the Liberal Democrat Daisy Cooper.

Rail
Train services are provided by Chiltern Railways and the Metropolitan line of the London Underground.

London Underground stations:
Chorleywood
Croxley
Rickmansworth
Moor Park

Chiltern Railways stations:
Chorleywood
Rickmansworth

A special fare structure exists as the stations are outside the Greater London boundary.

London Overground stations:
 Carpenders Park

West Coast Main Line stations:
 Kings Langley

Settlements
Abbots Langley
Chorleywood
Croxley Green
Loudwater
Maple Cross
Moor Park
Rickmansworth
Sarratt
South Oxhey

Civil parishes

Three Rivers is partially parished. There are six civil parishes in the district:
Abbots Langley
Batchworth
Chorleywood
Croxley Green
Sarratt
Watford Rural

There are two areas of unparished land: one larger area including Maple Cross and Mill End, Rickmansworth; and a smaller area including part of Loudwater.

Footnotes

External links
 Three Rivers District Council
 Map of the district

 
Districts of Hertfordshire
1974 establishments in England